The men's C-2 1000 metres event was an open-style, pairs canoeing event conducted as part of the Canoeing at the 1980 Summer Olympics program.

Medalists

Results

Heats
Twelve teams entered in two heats on July 31, but one withdrew. The top three finishers from each of the heats advanced directly to the final and the remaining five teams were relegated to the semifinal.

Semifinal
A semifinal was held on August 2. The top three finishers from the semifinal advanced to the final.

Final
The final was held on August 2.

References
1980 Summer Olympics official report Volume 3. p. 193. 
Sports-reference.com 1980 C-2 1000 m results.

Men's C-2 1000
Men's events at the 1980 Summer Olympics